David W. Graves (born 1953) is an American educator and theologian who serves as a General Superintendent in the Church of the Nazarene.

Education and family
Graves was educated at Olivet Nazarene University and received a Master of Divinity degree from Nazarene Theological Seminary. Graves received an honorary Doctor of Divinity from Olivet Nazarene University. Graves and his wife, Sharon, have four grown children.

Career
Graves pastored in Kansas, Ohio, Tennessee, Oklahoma, and North Carolina. From 2001 to 2006, he was the director of Sunday School Ministries for the Church of the Nazarene International Headquarters. In 2006, he was called to be senior pastor of College Church of the Nazarene in Olathe, Kansas, where he was serving when elected General Superintendent. Graves was elected as the church's 38th General Superintendent during its 27th General Assembly in 2009 in Orlando, Florida.

Books
Sermon Outlines on the Book of Colossians, Beacon Hill Press of Kansas City, 2003 (0834120658)

References

External sources
 Church of the Nazarene biography of Dr. David W. Graves 
 Engage Magazine coverage of Dr. Graves' visit to Ethiopia on behalf of the church's leadership.

Further reading
Sermon Outlines on the Book of Hebrews by Dr. David W. Graves, published in 2003 by Beacon Hill Press of Kansas City 

1953 births
American Nazarene ministers
Olivet Nazarene University alumni
Living people
Nazarene General Superintendents